Milan Langer (born in Prague, 1955) is a Czech pianist.

He won Smetana Competition and the Chopin Competition in Mariánské Lázně, and was prized at the 1976 Paloma O'Shea Competition. Langer is best known for his work as a member of the Czech Trio (1994- ) and his recordings for Supraphon on the Czech pre-romantic repertory, such as Václav Tomášek's Eclogues and Antonín Rejcha's fugues.

Langer is the head of the Prague Conservatory's piano department.

References
  Prague Conservatory

Living people
1955 births
Czech pianists
Prize-winners of the Paloma O'Shea International Piano Competition
21st-century pianists